Boudry is a department or commune of Ganzourgou Province in central-eastern Burkina Faso. Its capital is the town of Boudry. According to the 2019 census the department has a total population of 123,070.

Towns and villages
 Boudry (1,682 inhabitants) (capital)
 Bagzan (320)
 Boéna (8,094)
 Boudry-Peulh (82)
 Bourma (4,079)
 Dikomtinga (342)
 Douré (596)
 Foulgo (510)
 Gondré (2,146)
 Gouingo (2,052)
 Gounghin (917)
 Ibogo (386)
 Koankin (1,656)
 Kostenga (528)
 Liguidmalguéma (575)
 Lelkom (1,223)
 Limsèga (1,579)
 Manéssé (836)
 MankargaTraditionnel (1,204)
 Mankarga (14,752)
 Nabasnonghin (877)
 Nabmalguéma (712)
 Nabinkinsma (534)
 Nabiraogtenga (714)
 Nanom (533)
 Nadioutenga (448)
 Nédogo (2,018)
 Nédogo-Peulh (155)
 Ouaongtenga (467)
 Ouayalgui (13,892)
 Payamtenga (227)
 Pittyn (1,660)
 Poédogo (804)
 Pousghin (2,463)
 Sankuissi (1,983)
 Silmiougou (260)
 Songdin (622)
 Tallé (689)
 Tamissi (161)
 Tanama (1,474)
 Tanghin (437)
 Tankoala (74)
 Tanlouka (908)
 Taonsgo (1,211)
 Tansèga (436)
 Tanwaka (1,116)
 Tinsalgo (262)
 Toyogdo (390)
 Yaïka (1,482)
 Yinsinbingba (679)
 Zanrsin (526)
 Zoangpighin (919)

References

Departments of Burkina Faso
Ganzourgou Province